Virginia's 12th congressional district is an obsolete U.S. congressional district. It was eliminated in 1863 after the 1860 U.S. Census. Its last Member of Congress was Kellian V. Whaley.

List of members representing the district

Notes

References

 Congressional Biographical Directory of the United States 1774–present

12
Former congressional districts of the United States
1793 establishments in Virginia
1863 disestablishments in Virginia
Constituencies established in 1793
Constituencies disestablished in 1863